Mia Jalkerud  (born 5 November 1989) is a Swedish football forward who plays for Eskilstuna United DFF in the Swedish Damallsvenskan League. She has played Damallsvenskan football for Djurgårdens IF.

Career
Jalkerud has played for Enskede IK, Djurgårdens IF, Vasalunds IF and Avaldsnes.

References

External links
 

Toppserien players
Avaldsnes IL players
Vasalunds IF players
Swedish women's footballers
Djurgårdens IF Fotboll (women) players
Damallsvenskan players
1989 births
Living people
Enskede IK players
Women's association football forwards
Footballers from Stockholm